Stop is a 2004 studio album by Franco De Vita. The first hit single was "Tú De Qué Vas", which reached No. 3 on Billboard Hot Latin Tracks and No. 1 Latin Pop Airplay. "Ay Dios" and "Si La Ves", a collaboration with Sin Bandera, were also released as singles, with the latter also hitting the Top 10 in Billboard. The album earned a Latin Grammy Award nomination for Best Male Pop Vocal Album.

Track listing
"Ay Dios" - 5:04
"Rosa o Clavel" - 3:51
"Si La Ves" with Sin Bandera - 4:09
"No Me Lastimes" - 4:28
"Tú de Que Vas" - 4:01
"Vamos al Grano" - 3:22
"No Sé lo Que Me Das" - 4:04
"Donde Está el Amor" - 4:11
"Un Extraño En Mi Bañera" - 3:53

Sales and certifications

References

2004 albums
Franco De Vita albums